Chandra Kumara is a 1963 Indian Kannada-language film, directed by N. S. Varma and produced by T Madar. The film stars Rajkumar, Udaykumar, Rajashankar and Narasimharaju. The film has musical scores by T. Chalapathi Rao and M. Venkataraju.

The plot is about a man faces who face a lot of problems in his life and learns a lesson through a hard way that neither fate nor destiny can be changed by human efforts. Udaykumar played the titular character Chandrakumara while Rajkumar appeared as his father in law Prachanda. Krishnakumari played the role of Rajkumar's daughter. This is the only movie in which Rajkumar played the role of father in law to Udaykumar.

Cast

Rajkumar
Udaykumar
Rajashankar
Narasimharaju
Balakrishna
Krishnakumari
Rajasree
B. Jayashree
Sheshkumari
B. Jaya
Eshwarappa
Ganapathi Bhat
Hanumantha Rao
Kupparaj
Rajendra Krishna
Jagadish

References

1963 films
1960s Kannada-language films
Films scored by M. Venkataraju
Films scored by G. K. Venkatesh